The Roman Catholic Diocese of Saitama is a diocese located in the city of Saitama in the Ecclesiastical province of Tokyo in Japan.

History
 January 4, 1939: Established as Apostolic Prefecture of Urawa from the Diocese of Yokohama
 December 16, 1957: Promoted as Diocese of Urawa
 March 31, 2003: Renamed as Diocese of Saitama
 June 2, 2018: Appointment of Rev. Don Mario Michiaki Yamanouchi, S.D.B.

Leadership
 Bishops of Saitama (Roman rite)
Bishop  Mario Michiaki Yamanouchi, SDB (マリオ山野内倫) (2018.06.02 – present)
 Bishop Marcellino Taiji Tani (マルセリーノ谷大二) (2000.05.10 -Resigned 2013.07.27) 
 Bishops of Urawa (Roman rite)
 Archbishop Peter Takeo Okada (ペトロ岡田武夫) (1991.04.15 – 2000.02.17)
 Archbishop Francis Xavier Kaname Shimamoto (フランシスコ・ザビエル島本要), Ist. del Prado (1979.12.20 – 1990.02.08)
 Bishop Laurentius Satoshi Nagae (ラウレンチオ長江 恵) (1957.12.24 – 1979.12.20)
 Prefects Apostolic of Urawa (Roman rite)
 Fr. Paul Sakuzo Uchino (パウロ内野作蔵) (1945.12.13 – 1957)
 Fr. Ambroise Leblanc (アンブローズ・ルブラン), O.F.M. (1939 – 1940)

See also
Roman Catholicism in Japan

Sources
 GCatholic.org
 Catholic Hierarchy

References

External links 
 Diocese website
 http://www.cbcj.catholic.jp/jpn/diocese/saitama.htm

Roman Catholic dioceses in Japan
Christian organizations established in 1939
Roman Catholic dioceses and prelatures established in the 20th century
1939 establishments in Japan